Aristotel Petrović (1881–1920) was a Bosnian politician who served as the 6th Mayor of Sarajevo from 1918 to 1920. He was Sarajevo's first mayor post-World War I and in the Kingdom of Serbs, Croats and Slovenes.

Early life and family
Petrović was born to a family of Bosnian Serb merchants in Sarajevo, Bosnia and Herzegovina. His father Petar Petrović was a Serb from Korçë, Albania who self-identified as ethnically Greek and gave his three sons (Aristotel, Diogen and Sokrat) Greek names.

Politics
After the First World War ended in 1918, Petrović was elected as Sarajevo's 6th mayor on 2 December of that year, and served until Ljudevit Novat was elected in the November 1920 elections, although he had attempted to resign in May 1920. He was the city's first mayor in the Kingdom of Serbs, Croats and Slovenes.

References

1881 births
1920 deaths
Politicians from Sarajevo
Serbs of Bosnia and Herzegovina
Mayors of Sarajevo